Fenoxycarb is a carbamate insect growth regulator. It has a low toxicity for bees, birds, and humans, but is toxic to fish.

Fenoxycarb is non-neurotoxic and does not have the same mode of action as other carbamate insecticides.  Instead, it prevents immature insects from reaching maturity by mimicking juvenile hormone.

External links

References

Carbamate insecticides
Phenol ethers
Ethyl esters